The 1915 Furman Baptists football team represented Furman University during the 1915 college football season as a member of the Southern Intercollegiate Athletic Association (SIAA). Furman compiled an overall record of 5–3 with a mark of 1–1 in SIAA play. The team began the season led by second-year W. B. Bible, who also served as the school's athletic director. Bible resigned in mid-November, before Furman final game of the season. Assistant coach Billy Laval was elected to succeed Bible as head coach.

Schedule

References

Furman
Furman Paladins football seasons
Furman Baptists football